This article gives an overview of liberal and radical parties in Chile. It is limited to liberal and radical parties with substantial support, mainly proved by having had a representation in parliament. The sign ⇒ means a reference to another party in that scheme. For inclusion in this scheme, parties do not necessarily need to have labeled themselves as a liberal party.

Introduction
Liberalism was organized as the traditional opposition to conservatism in Chile. In the 1860s radical liberals formed the radical current. Traditional liberalism disappeared in the 1960s into conservatism and radicalism developed into social democracy, leaving liberalism unrepresented. Originally the Social Democrat Radical Party (Partido Radical Social-Democráta, member SI) was a left of center liberal party, but nowadays it is a social democratic party.

The timeline

Liberal Party
1846: The Liberal Party (Partido Liberal) is formed
1861: A vehemtly anticlericalist faction formed the ⇒ Radical Party
1876: A faction supporting the presidential candidacy of Benjamín Vicuña Mackenna formed the ⇒ Liberal Democratic Party, but returns to the ⇒ Liberal Party after Vicuña ends his candidacy
1885: An anti-government faction formed the ⇒ Independent Liberal Party
1891: The faction supporting President Balmaceda in the 1891 civil war formed a second ⇒ Liberal Democratic Party.
1920: Dissidents seceded as the ⇒ Unionist Liberal
1931: Another faction formed the ⇒ United Liberal Party
1933: The ⇒ Liberal Democratic Party and the ⇒ Independent Liberal Party merged into the Liberal Party
1966: The party merged into the new National Party (Partido Nacional)

Radical Party
1863: A radical faction of the ⇒ Liberal Party formed the Radical Party (Partido Radical)
1887: The more leftist Democratic Party seceded from the party
1931: The more leftist faction formed the ⇒ Radical Socialist Party
1941: The ⇒ Radical Socialist Party rejoined the party
1946: A moderate faction formed the ⇒ Radical Democratic Party
1948: A faction opposition to the anti-Communist laws ⇒ Radical Doctrinal Party
1949: The ⇒ Radical Democrat Party rejoined the party
1961: The ⇒ Radical Doctrinal Party rejoined the party
1969: In reaction to left-wing tendencies an anti-Communist faction seceded as ⇒ Radical Democracy
1971: A moderate faction of the party formed the ⇒ Left Radical Party
1972: The ⇒ Socialdemocrat Party joined the party
1994: The party, who was unable to garner a significant number of votes in the parliamentary elections, joins the Party of Social Democracy and forms the Social Democrat Radical Party (Partido Radical Social Demócrata)

Liberal Democratic Party (1876)
1876: The faction of the ⇒ Liberal Party led by Benjamín Vicuña Mackenna formed the Liberal Democratic Party (Partido Liberal Democrático), but rejoins the ⇒ Liberal Party that same year

Independent Liberal Party
1885: An anti-government faction of the ⇒ Liberal Party formed the Independent Liberal Party (Partido Liberal Doctrinario)
1933: The party rejoined the ⇒ Liberal Party

Liberal Democratic Party (1892)
1891: The faction of the ⇒ Liberal Party that supported President José Manuel Balmaceda in the 1891 civil war formed the Liberal Democratic Party (Partido Liberal Democrático)
1933: The party rejoined the ⇒ Liberal Party

Unionist Liberal
1920: Dissidents from the ⇒ Liberal Party formed the Unionist Liberal (Liberal Unionista)
1927: The party didn't survive the 1927 dictatorship of Carlos Ibáñez.

United Liberal Party
1931: A faction of the ⇒ Liberal Party formed the United Liberal Party (Partido Liberal Unido)
1933: The party rejoined the ⇒ Liberal Party

Radical Socialist Party
1931: The more leftist faction formed the Radical Socialist Party (Partido Radical Socialista)
1941: A faction of the party rejoined the ⇒ Radical Party 
1941: A faction of the party joined the ⇒ Socialist Party (Partido Socialista)

Radical Democratic Party
1946: A moderate faction of the ⇒ Radical Party formed the Radical Democratic Party (Partido Radical Democrático)
1949: The Radical Democratic Party rejoined the ⇒ Radical Party

Radical Doctrinal Party
1948: A faction opposition to the Law of Permanent Defense of Democracy (anti-Communist law) formed the ⇒ Radical Doctrinal Party (Partido Radical Doctrinario)
1961: A faction of the Radical Doctrinal Party rejoined the ⇒ Radical Party
1961: A faction of the Radical Doctrinal Party formed the ⇒ National Democratic Party (Partido Democrático Nacional)

Radical Democracy
1969: In reaction to growingly leftist tendencies in the ⇒ Radical Party a moderate, anti-Communist faction seceded as Radical Democracy (Democracia Radical).
1973: The party opposed Salvador Allende and voluntarily dissolved itself after the 1973 coup.
1988: The party reappeared to participate on the 1989 elections.
1990: The party, who was unable to garner a significant number of votes in the parliamentary elections, joins the National Advance and the National Party and forms the National Democracy of Center (Democracia Nacional de Centro).

Left Radical Party
1971: A moderate faction of the ⇒ Radical Party formed the Left Radical Party (Partido Izquierda Radical), later renamed the Chilean Social Democracy Party. 
1994: The party fused with the Radical Party to form the Social Democrat Radical Party

Liberal leaders
Arturo Alessandri Palma

See also
 History of Chile
 Politics of Chile
 List of political parties in Chile

References

Chile
Radical parties in Chile
Political movements in Chile